Oxalis albicans, commonly known as radishroot woodsorrel, is North American species of perennial herbs in the woodsorrel family. It is widespread in Mexico (from Baja California east to Coahuila and south as far as Oaxaca) and the southwestern United States (California, New Mexico, Arizona, western Texas).

The plant is found in the California Coast Ranges, Sierra Nevada, Transverse Ranges, Peninsular Ranges, and other regions of the state.

Former subspecies

Currently recognized Oxalis species, that were formerly considered Oxalis albicans subspecies, include:
Oxalis pilosa, formerly Oxalis albicans ssp. pilosa — hairy wood sorrel; from Baja California, through California, to British Columbia; below .

References

External links
Jepson Manual Treatment — Oxalis albicans

albicans
Flora of North America
Natural history of the California chaparral and woodlands
Natural history of the California Coast Ranges
Natural history of the San Francisco Bay Area
Natural history of the Santa Monica Mountains
Natural history of the Transverse Ranges
Plants described in 1821
Flora without expected TNC conservation status